Stepanovskaya is a rural locality (a village) in Yavengskoye Rural Settlement, Vozhegodsky District, Vologda Oblast, Russia. The population was 10 as of 2002.

Geography 
Stepanovskaya is located 34 km northeast of Vozhega (the district's administrative centre) by road. Fedyayevskaya is the nearest rural locality.

References 

Rural localities in Vozhegodsky District